Eucithara pulchella is a small sea snail, a marine gastropod mollusk in the family Mangeliidae.

Description
The length of the shell attains 12 mm.

The shell is many ribbed, the ribs flexuous, narrow, the interstices very faintly reticulated. Its color is yellowish white, with several narrow chestnut bands interrupted by the ribs.

Distribution
This marine species occurs off the Philippines, Queensland (Australia) and Tonga.

References

  Reeve, L.A. 1846. Monograph of the genus Mangelia. pls 1-8 in Reeve, L.A. (ed). Conchologia Iconica. London : L. Reeve & Co. Vol. 3.

External links
  Tucker, J.K. 2004 Catalog of recent and fossil turrids (Mollusca: Gastropoda). Zootaxa 682:1-1295
 
  Hedley, C. 1922. A revision of the Australian Turridae. Records of the Australian Museum 13(6): 213-359, pls 42-56

pulchella
Gastropods described in 1846